Marion "Mack" Boyd Stokes (December 21, 1911 – November 21, 2012) was an American bishop of the United Methodist Church, elected in 1972.  He was born in Wonsan, Korea of missionary parents. He is a graduate of Asbury College (A.B. degree), Duke Divinity School (B.D. degree, 1935), and Boston University (Ph.D. degree). He was a professor of systematic theology and Christian doctrine at Candler School of Theology at Emory University from 1941 until 1972.  After retiring as a bishop, Stokes served as associate dean and professor of theology at Oral Roberts University, Tulsa, Oklahoma. He died at the age of 100 in 2012.

Selected writings
The Bible in the Wesleyan Heritage, Nashville, Abingdon, 1981.
Major United Methodist Beliefs (Revised and Enlarged), Nashville, Abingdon, 1971 (previous editions:  1955 and 1956).

See also
List of bishops of the United Methodist Church

References

1911 births
2012 deaths
American centenarians
American United Methodist bishops
Arminian ministers
Arminian theologians
Asbury University alumni
Boston University alumni
Duke Divinity School alumni
Emory University faculty
Men centenarians
Oral Roberts University faculty